The Rhode Island Lottery (or The Lot) is run by the government of Rhode Island. The modern form of the Rhode Island Lottery was inaugurated in 1974, following a constitutional amendment passed in 1973. It is a charter member of the Multi-State Lottery Association (MUSL). Rhode Island Lottery games include Mega Millions, Powerball, Wild Money, keno, and scratch tickets. Rhode Island also offers video lottery, which includes the multi-jurisdictional MegaHits game.

The minimum age to play the Rhode Island Lottery is 18.

History
Lotteries played an important role in Rhode Island from the colonial period until the mid-19th Century.  They were banned by the colonial legislature in 1732, only to be brought back in 1744.  They continued, generally under control of the Rhode Island General Assembly, until being banned again in 1842. The lottery was reintroduced in 1974, as Rhode Island joined several states, including New Hampshire, New York, and New Jersey, in introducing state lotteries. It is a charter member of the Multi-State Lottery Association

In June 2018, Rhode Island Governor Gina Raimondo signed legislation permitting sports betting within the state, which is currently overseen and regulated by the Rhode Island Lottery, and run by William Hill.

Current draw games

In-house draw games

The Numbers Game
Begun in 1976, it was the first Rhode Island Lottery game where players could select their numbers. Nightly, four sets of balls numbered 0 through 9 are drawn. Prizes and options vary. Rhode Island, unusually, does not draw a three-digit number separately; however, players can choose "first three" or "last three".

"Midday" drawings for The Numbers Game have been added.

Wild Money
Wild Money is drawn 7 days a week (previously was on Tuesdays, Thursdays and Saturdays only before July 2020). It draws 5 balls numbered 1-38 (previously was 35 before July 2020), with an "Extra Ball" drawn from the remaining 33. The "Extra Ball" is used to determine some of the prizes, but not the jackpot, which starts at $20,000. Games are $1.

Keno (limited availability)
Keno is played at retailers equipped with a special monitor. Drawings are 4 minutes apart during Keno hours. Prizes and options vary.

Bingo
Bingo drawings take place every 8 minutes.  Retailers are equipped with a monitor displaying the drawings. 30 numbers are drawn. Players must match the called numbers to their numbers on the display to create Bingo patterns. The object is to match one of the Rhode Island Lottery Bingo patterns.

Multi-jurisdictional games

Mega Millions

Rhode Island joined Mega Millions on January 31, 2010; it was part of the cross-sell expansion that took place on that date. (Most U.S. lotteries with either Mega Millions or Powerball joined the other on that date; the agreement was finalized on October 13, 2009.)

Mega Millions is drawn Tuesdays and Fridays; its starting jackpot is $15 million. Games are $2 each, or $3 if the "Megaplier" multiplier is activated.

Powerball
Rhode Island was among the seven founding members of MUSL, formed in 1987. Its best-known game, Powerball, began in 1992. Games are $2 each; a PowerPlay game is $3. The "PowerPlay" option began in 2001. Jackpots start at $40 million; it is drawn Wednesdays and Saturdays.

Powerball has undergone several format changes. The first was in 1997, which introduced its cash option. Its current format began in 2015. Power Play winnings again are determined by a random multiplier.

Rhode Island's largest lottery prize was $336,400,000 (annuity value) for the February 11, 2012 drawing; the cash option was chosen.

MegaHits (video lottery)

Rhode Island's two lottery-run casinos (Twin River in Lincoln and Newport Grand in Newport) offer MegaHits, MUSL's second video lottery terminal (VLT) progressive jackpot game. MegaHits began in 2011; it replaced Cashola. (Delaware, Maryland, Ohio, and West Virginia also offer MegaHits.) MegaHits features five jackpots; the top progressive's minimum is $100,000. All MegaHits jackpots are paid in cash. The maximum wager must be made to be eligible for any of the progressives. (All MegaHits wagers feed the top progressive level; however, the other progressives are fed by MegaHits wagers within that lottery's jurisdiction.)

Lucky For Life

In 2009, the Connecticut Lottery began an in-state game called Lucky4Life. It was replaced three years later by a regional game with a modified name: Lucky for Life (LFL), adding Maine, Massachusetts, New Hampshire, Vermont, and Rhode Island.

The current LFL, which began on September 17, 2013, costs $2 per play. Players pick 5 of 43 white balls, and 1 of 43 green "Lucky Balls." First and second prizes are "lifetime" annuities: $1,000 per day for a perfect match (5+1), or $25,000 per year for a 5+0 match.
A winner of either lifetime annuity can choose cash instead of the periodic payments.

On January 27, 2015, LFL became a "quasi-national game"; as of 2017 it is offered in 22 states and the District of Columbia; with an additional three states planning to join.

Former games

Lot-O-Bucks
Lot-O-Bucks was the Rhode Island Lottery's first terminal-based jackpot game. It ended in 1995. Lot-O-Bucks used several different number matrixes, most recently a pick-5-of-40.

Cashola
The first MUSL video lottery progressive, Cashola, began in July 2006; it ended when its 37th jackpot was won, on May 15, 2011. Cashola's jackpot was its only progressive level.

References

External links
Rhode Island Lottery website

State lotteries of the United States
Economy of Rhode Island
State agencies of Rhode Island
1974 establishments in Rhode Island
Government agencies established in 1974